Samuel Renel (born 3 November 2001) is a French professional footballer who plays as a midfielder for Ligue 2 club Niort.

Career
On 7 August 2019, Renel signed a contract with Niort. On Renel made his professional debut with Niort in a 1–1 Ligue 2 tie with AS Nancy on 6 March 2020.

Career statistics

References

External links
 
 OM 1899 Profile

Living people
2001 births
Sportspeople from Fort-de-France
Martiniquais footballers
French footballers
Association football midfielders
Chamois Niortais F.C. players
Ligue 2 players
Championnat National 2 players
Championnat National 3 players